The Immortal is an American television series, starring Christopher George as a man whose blood chemistry and resistance to almost all diseases (including old age) makes him both almost immortal and a target of several wealthy men who would basically use him as a personal blood bank, aired on ABC from September 24, 1970 to January 14, 1971. The series is based on a pilot film of the same name, which aired on September 30, 1969 as an ABC Movie of the Week. The pilot is based on the 1964 science fiction novel The Immortals, by James Gunn.

The series music was composed by Dominic Frontiere, who is primarily known for scoring the sci-fi anthology series The Outer Limits. Although The Immortal was canceled at midseason, episodes were rerun by ABC in the summer of 1971. It was later rerun on the American Forces Network in Europe in the 1980s and on the Sci Fi Channel in the 1990s.

Series overview
Ben Richards is a test car driver for a large corporation owned by billionaire Jordan Braddock. He is 43 years old, but looks young enough to pass for 30—and he has never been sick a day in his life. Ben's life changes when he donates a pint of blood. When Braddock, who is dying, is given a blood transfusion of his donated blood, and is brought back from the brink of death, Ben's physician, Dr. Matthew Pearce, determines that his O-negative blood contains all known antibodies and immunities. This gives Ben immunity to every known disease and an estimated lifespan five to ten times that of other humans, making him, in the doctor's words, "virtually immortal". The billionaire decides that he has to control Richards' life so he can access his life-saving blood.

When Richards rejects all of Braddock's offers to remain with him, the billionaire has him imprisoned, but he ultimately escapes. Richards tells his fiancée Sylvia Cartwright that they can never marry because she would also be imprisoned by Braddock (in the episode "Sylvia" Richards puts himself in danger to visit Cartwright at her wedding to another man). Richards is now on the run because when Braddock dies (shown in the flashback episode "To The Gods Alone" which resolved plot points between the pilot and the series), one of his former employees, Fletcher (who did not appear in the pilot), is hired by another billionaire, Arthur Maitland, who also wants access to Richards' blood.

The series' dramatic tension is based on the idea that Richards would probably never lose his life if he were to live quietly, since he would never succumb to any known diseases. But his flight from Fletcher puts his life at great risk, constantly engaging in dangerous efforts to avoid capture, and his "immortal" blood did not make him immune to losing his life from injury.

The series primarily focuses on Richards' journeys and the people he meets while trying to avoid Fletcher. A secondary plot involved Richards' search for a brother he has never known, with the implication that that brother may share his gift and thus be at risk from unscrupulous billionaires as well. Ben Richards is imprisoned by a young billionaire, Simon Brent, in an episode titled "The Queen's Gambit." In the episode "Man On A Punched Card" Maitland hires computer programmer Terry Kerwin to track and predict Richards' movements using a mainframe computer. Kerwin was played by Christopher George's real-life wife Lynda Day George, who would co-star on another Paramount TV series Mission: Impossible from 1971 to 1973.

The plotline of The Immortal is quite different from that of the book on which it is based (the protagonist of the book was a vagrant, not a test driver, who discovers his immortality when he sells his blood). Instead, The Immortal bears more than a superficial resemblance to the then-recent, very popular TV series, The Fugitive, which still aired in syndicated reruns.  That series had ended its four-season run three years before The Immortal began. It is also the mirror of the series Run for Your Life about a man suffering from a terminal disease who wants to experience everything because he is going to die soon, while Richards has to run because he will live virtually forever. The Immortal was cancelled before a proper finale episode could be filmed.

Cast
 Christopher George as Ben Richards
 Don Knight as Fletcher
 David Brian as Arthur Maitland
 Carol Lynley as Sylvia Cartwright
 Barry Sullivan as Jordan Braddock
 Jessica Walter as Janet Braddock
 Ralph Bellamy as Dr. Matthew Pearce
 Nico Minardos as Simon Brent
 Paul Frees Narrator

Episodes

DVD release

On October 16, 2017, it was announced that Visual Entertainment Inc. had acquired the rights to the series. They subsequently released The Immortal - 'The Complete Collection' on DVD in Region 1 on November 9, 2017.

See also
Immortality in fiction

References

External links

 
 

American Broadcasting Company original programming
1970s American drama television series
Television series by CBS Studios
1970 American television series debuts
1971 American television series endings
1970s American science fiction television series
Television shows based on American novels
English-language television shows
Fiction about immortality
Television shows set in Kentucky